Basak Senova is an art curator, writer and designer from Istanbul, Turkey. She lives and works in Vienna since 2017.

She holds an MFA in graphic design and a PhD in art, design and architecture from Bilkent University, and is active internationally with art and technology related projects. She attended the Seventh Curatorial Training Programme of Stichting De Appel, Amsterdam in 2002. As an assistant professor, she lectured in various universities in Turkey, including Kadir Has University, Bilgi University, Koç University and Bilkent University. In 2017 she was the resident fellow at the University of the Arts, Helsinki in co-operation with HIAP. In 2017, she received Associate Professorship by the Higher Education Council of Turkey. At the moment she is a Visiting Professor at the University of Applied Arts, Vienna (Universität für Angewandte Kunst Wien).

She has been writing on art art, technology and media, initiating and developing projects and curating exhibitions since 1995.

Curatorial

Senova was the curator of the Pavilion of Turkey at the 53rd Venice Biennale. She co-curated the UNCOVERED (Cyprus) and the 2nd and 5th Biennial of Contemporary Art, D-0 ARK Underground (Bosnia and Herzegovina). In 2014, she acted as the Art Gallery Chair of (ACM) SIGGRAPH 2014 (Vancouver) the curator of the Helsinki Photography Biennial 2014 and the Jerusalem Show VII: Fractures. In 2015, she curated the Pavilion of Republic of Macedonia at the 56th Venice Biennale and in 2016, Lines of Passage (in medias res) Exhibition in Lesvos and in 2019 the inaugural exhibition of B7L9, Climbing through the Tide in Tunis. In 2019, she also completed a long-term research-based art project CrossSections in Vienna, Helsinki, and Stockholm.

Şenova has initiated projects and curated exhibitions in Turkey and abroad since 1996. Her curatorial projects include ctrl-alt-del sound art project series (since 2003), "NOMAD-TV.network 01", "loosing.ctrl", "Serial Cases", "under.ctrl", "s-network", "Rejection Episodes", "Conscious in Coma", "Unrecorded",  "Aftermath", "Soft Borders" and "The Translation". She curated Zorlu Center Collection for two years (2011-2012) and during that time she was the editor of its publications. She acted as an advisory board member of the Turkish Pavilion in Venice Biennial and Istanbul Biennial.

Editoral

Senova is the editor of art-ist 6, Kontrol Online Magazine, Lapses book series, UNCOVERED, Aftermath, Obje'ct, The Move, The Translation, Scientific Inquiries, Cultural Massacre, Ahmet Elhan-Ground Glass and Lines of Passage (in medias res) among other publications. She is one of the editorial correspondents of ibraaz.org and Turkish correspondent of Flash Art International. She is a member of the International Biennial Association's (IBA) editorial board.

References

External links
 http://basaksenova.com
Basak Senova on Guggenheim Blog
Basak Senova, Resident of Angewandte
Basak Senova, Curator of the inaugural exhibition of B7L9, Climbing through the Tide
Basak Senova and B7L9, Tunis
Basak Senova and Jerusalem Show VII
ibraaz on Basak Senova and Jerusalem Show VII: Fractures
Basak Senova and the program of Jerusalem Show VII: Fractures
How two Turkish women have been making Istanbul a hub for contemporary art by  Joobin Bekhrad on ReOrient
Basak Senova and Helsinki Photography Biennial 2014
Basak Senova and some of the activities of Helsinki Photography Biennial 2014
Basak Senova and the program of Helsinki Photography Biennial 2014
Siggraph 2014 Art Gallery and Basak Senova
Rachele Riley on Siggraph 2014 Art Gallery and Basak Senova
Siggraph 2014 Art Gallery explores Acting in Translation with Basak Senova
Basak Senova and the 2nd edition of Project Biennial D-0 ARK Underground, Bosnia and Herzegovina
2nd edition of Project Biennial D-0 ARK Underground, Bosnia and Herzegovina curated by Basak Senova
An interview with Basak Senova of NOMAD by Süreyya Evren
A Talk by Hera Buyuktasciyan and Basak Senova
 Cevdet Erek in Conversation with Basak Senova
 Interview with Basak Senova, recorded at Platform´s Garanti residency studio Istanbul. May 2006, by son:DA

Living people
Turkish art curators
Year of birth missing (living people)
Turkish women curators